Deena Weinstein (born March 15, 1943) is a professor of sociology at DePaul University whose research focuses on popular culture. She is particularly well known for her research on heavy metal culture, on which subject she wrote a ground-breaking book, Heavy Metal: A Cultural Sociology (1991), later published in a revised and updated version as Heavy Metal: The Music and Its Culture (2009).

Career
Weinstein holds a PhD from Purdue University. Her 1991 book Heavy Metal: A Cultural Sociology "describes the heavy metal music culture, explains why it has prompted demands for censorship, and argues that the music deserves tolerance and respect." She argues that heavy metal has outlasted many other rock genres largely due to the emergence of an intense, exclusionary, strongly masculine subculture. A review of the book calls it: A reasonable summary of most academic study so far, which indulges heavy metal as an extreme offshoot of rock in which rebellion is the prime goal and the fundamental ceremony is the live concert. These failings aside, there is very perceptive research here on the origins of heavy metal and the personalities within its culture. The latter is most informative of all aspects in this book and is Weinstein's strength as a writer.The Chicago Sun-Times called the book the definitive study of heavy metal culture, saying that it "does for metal what Greil Marcus's Lipstick Traces did for the Sex Pistols."

Weinstein was interviewed in the 2005 documentary Metal: A Headbanger's Journey and the later Metal Evolution.

References

American sociologists
American women sociologists
Purdue University alumni
DePaul University faculty
1943 births
Living people
21st-century American women